"Miss You" is a song recorded by American singer Aaliyah. Written by Johntá Austin, Ginuwine and Teddy Bishop in 1998, the song was initially recorded in 1999 for Aaliyah's eponymous third studio album (2001). However, it did not make the final cut for Aaliyah and remained unreleased until after Aaliyah's death in 2001. It was then included on the posthumous compilation album I Care 4 U (2002) and was released as its lead single on October 28, 2002, by Blackground Records and Universal Records.

Upon its release, "Miss You" received widespread acclaim from music critics. A commercial success, it peaked at number three on the US Billboard Hot 100, becoming Aaliyah's second highest-peaking single behind her number-one hit "Try Again" (2000), and atop the Hot R&B/Hip-Hop Songs. Internationally, it reached the top ten in Germany, and top 20 in Canada, Denmark, the Netherlands and Switzerland.

The accompanying music video for the song was directed by Darren Grant and featured tributes from Aaliyah's friends and collaborators, including DMX, Missy Elliott, and Static Major. It was nominated for Best R&B Video at the 2003 MTV Video Music Awards. Rapper Jay-Z made a tribute to Aaliyah using the "Miss You" instrumental and chorus for its official remix, released in March 2003.

Writing and production
Originally crafted for Ginuwine's second studio album 100% Ginuwine (1999), "Miss You" was written by Ginuwine, Johntá Austin and Teddy Bishop in 1998, and was produced by Bishop. In 1999, while Aaliyah was recording her eponymous third studio album (2001) at the Manhattan Center Studios, she requested Austin and Bishop to play her a couple of tracks they had produced with other artists, including "Miss You", for which Ginuwine had already lent his vocals. Bishop later commented: "She was like, 'I want to cut this record' [...] She got on the phone, called him and said 'Hey I know you cut this record already, but I would love to cut it'." Ginuwine allowed her to cut her own version of it and the same night, Aaliyah re-recorded the whole song. Although she reportedly wanted to put the song out herself, her label Blackground Records felt it was not a "smash record", thus the song was left unused until after Aaliyah's death.
According to Billboard, lyrically "The verses paint it as a clear breakup song, about being left by her college-bound high-school lover — but with a more ambiguous chorus full of heart-tugging lyrics (“It’s been too long and I’m lost without you/ What am I gonna do?”) and a bird-twittering background hook that sounds like the singer’s soul flying free, it’s a tearjerker anyway".

Release
"Miss You" was first made available on October 28, 2002, for streaming via AOL's program First Listen. Blackground Records and Universal Records serviced it to contemporary hit, rhythmic contemporary, urban contemporary and urban adult contemporary radio stations in the United States on November 12, as the lead single from I Care 4 U. Jay-Z's remix of the song was serviced to the urban contemporary radio on April 8, 2003, and was released as a CD single with the original version on April 29.

In August 2021, it was reported that Aaliyah's recorded work for Blackground (since rebranded as Blackground Records 2.0) would be re-released on physical, digital, and, for the first time ever, streaming services in a deal between the label and Empire Distribution. I Care 4 U and Ultimate Aaliyah, both including "Miss You", were re-released on October 8.

Critical reception
musicOMH called "Miss You" the best new song from I Care 4 U, as well as stating "poignant lyrics ... mix well with a thoughtful, reflective, laid back tune." Sal Cinquemani from Slant Magazine called the song "Aaliyah-lite". John Bush from AllMusic, while mentioning the song with "All I Need", said that they "don't have the edge of her classic Timbaland productions, but they stand up well — even when they're slotted next to the best songs of her career." Michael Paoletta from Billboard praised "Miss You", calling it "yet another showcase of a talent that was taken too soon" and adding: "The singer's breathy alto floats over a sensual, bass-heavy track, courtesy of Teddy Bishop". Damien Scott from Complex felt that the song "is a masterstroke in lovelorn yearning with Aaliyah spilling tears over a lost love. It made sense, then, that it was one of her last tracks, as it summed up the way her family, friends, and fans felt upon her passing". James Poletti from Dotmusic described the song as "deep 'n' honeyed sweetness" and felt that Aaliyah "evokes shuddering sensuality in every syllable".

Accolades

Commercial performance
In the United States, "Miss You" debuted at number 55 on the Billboard Hot 100 on November 30, 2002. It peaked at number three on the chart dated April 5, 2003, becoming Aaliyah's second highest-peaking single on the chart after the number-one "Try Again" (2000), and spent a total of 30 weeks on the chart. The song also peaked atop the Hot R&B/Hip-Hop Songs on January 25, spending three weeks at the summit. On the 2003 year-end charts, "Miss You" was ranked eighth on the Billboard Hot 100 and third on the Hot R&B/Hip-Hop Songs. Six years after its release, on November 22, 2008, the song debuted and peaked at number 38 on the US Hot Ringtones. After the October 8, 2021 re-release of I Care 4 U and Ultimate Aaliyah, "Miss You" debuted and peaked at number five on the US R&B Digital Song Sales.

Internationally, "Miss You" was a moderate commercial success. In Canada, it peaked at number 14 in its sixth week on the Canadian Singles Chart, where it spent a total of 13 weeks. The song reached the top ten in Germany, where it debuted and peaked at number eight on January 27, 2003. It also peaked at number 15 in both Denmark and Switzerland. In the Netherlands, it peaked at number 25 on the Dutch Top 40 and number 14 on the Single Top 100. In the United Kingdom, "Miss You" debuted at number 91 on the UK Singles Chart for the week ending February 1. It peaked at number 76 in its fourth week, becoming Aaliyah's lowest-peaking single in the country.

Music video
The accompanying music video for "Miss You" was directed by Darren Grant and was filmed in November 2002 in Long Island City, New York, and Los Angeles. The video includes segments from Aaliyah's previous music videos, alongside cameo appearances from Aaliyah's close friends and peers, who were shown lip-syncing to the song. Celebrities who were present at the Long Island video shoot included Missy Elliott, Lil' Kim, Tweet, Queen Latifah, Jaheim, Lyric, and Lil' Jon and the Eastside Boyz, while those present at the Los Angeles shoot included Jamie Foxx, DMX, Quincy Jones and Ananda Lewis.

Track listings and formats

US CD single
 "Miss You" – 4:04
 "Miss You" (remix featuring Jay-Z) – 4:09

UK CD single
 "Miss You" – 4:04
 "We Need a Resolution" – 4:04

Belgian, Dutch and Luxembourgish CD single
 "Miss You" – 4:04
 "Miss You" (music video) – 4:17

European CD single
 "Miss You" – 4:04
 "One in a Million" – 4:30

European maxi CD single
 "Miss You" – 4:04
 "One in a Million" – 4:30
 "At Your Best (You Are Love)" – 4:49

Credits and personnel
Credits are adapted from the liner notes of I Care 4 U.
 Aaliyah – vocals
 Johntá Austin – writing
 Teddy Bishop – production, writing
 Ginuwine – writing
 Acar Keys – mixing, recording

Charts

Weekly charts

Year-end charts

Release history

See also
 List of Hot R&B/Hip-Hop Singles & Tracks number ones of 2003

Notes

References

External links
 
 
 Official website

2002 singles
Aaliyah songs
Music videos directed by Darren Grant
Songs written by Johntá Austin
Pop ballads
Contemporary R&B ballads
Songs released posthumously
Songs about heartache
Torch songs
2000s ballads